Erik Durm (born 12 May 1992) is a German professional footballer who plays as a full-back for 2. Bundesliga club 1. FC Kaiserslautern. 

He made his senior debut for the Germany national team in 2014, and later that year was part of their squad which won the World Cup.

Club career

Early career
Durm began his club career in 1998 at the academy of SG Rieschweiler, before joining the academy of 1. FC Saarbrücken in 2008 where he became youth league top scorer of the 2009–2010 season with 13 goals. In July 2010, Durm was enrolled at the academy of 1. FSV Mainz 05 and won the 2010–11 Youth Federation Cup in Germany and Durm debuted and played his only game of the 2010–11 season for the second team of 1. FSV Mainz 05 on 4 December 2010 against SV Elversberg in the German Regionalliga.

In the 2011–12 season, Durm succeeded to the second team of 1. FSV Mainz 05 and scored seven goals in 1. FSV Mainz 05 II's and his first 10 games. Then Durm went on to score two goals in a 1. FSV Mainz 05 II 3–0 away win on matchday 7 against the second team of Eintracht Frankfurt. Following the scoring of nine goals in the first half of the 2011–12 season, Durm scored four goals in the second half of the 2011–12 season and in January 2012, both 1. FSV Mainz 05 and Borussia Dortmund offered Durm a professional contract, but Durm declined the offer from 1. FSV Mainz 05 to sign with BVB.

Borussia Dortmund
In the 2012–13 season, Durm signed a contract with Borussia Dortmund until June 2014 and Durm was inducted into Borussia Dortmund II competing in the German third league. In the 2012–13 3. Liga season, on 21 July 2012, Durm made his professional football debut in a game for Borussia Dortmund II against VfL Osnabrück. On 18 May 2013, Durm featured in the 38th and last matchday in a 1–0 away win over the second team of VfB Stuttgart.

In the 2013–14 Bundesliga season, Durm was inducted into Borussia Dortmund's first team and, on 10 August 2013, debuted for BVB in the Bundesliga; coming on in the 87th minute for Robert Lewandowski as a substitute in BVB's 4–0 win over FC Augsburg. Durm debuted in the UEFA Champions League on 1 October 2013 in a 3–0 victory over French club Olympique Marseille.

At the start of the 2014–15 season, Durm came on as a substitute in the 2014 DFL-Supercup. He scored his first Bundesliga goal in a 2–0 victory over Hertha Berlin on 9 May 2015.

Huddersfield Town
On 13 July 2018, it was announced that Durm had completed a transfer to Huddersfield Town for an undisclosed fee. Durm signed a one-year contract, with the club having the option to extend for a further year.

Eintracht Frankfurt
On 3 July 2019, Durm joined Bundesliga club Eintracht Frankfurt on a four-year-contract.

Kaiserslautern
On 22 June 2022, Durm moved to 1. FC Kaiserslautern.

International career

Youth
Durm played in 2011 for both the German under-19 team and the German under-20 team; and he debuted for the under-19 team on 31 May 2011 in a 3–0 victory against Hungary, and scored two goals. On 12 November 2011, Durm debuted for the German under-20 team against Poland. Durm debuted for the German under-21 team on 13 August 2013, in a 0–0 draw against France.

Senior
On 1 June 2014, Durm debuted for the German senior team in a 2–2 draw against Cameroon at the Borussia-Park in Mönchengladbach. He played 85 minutes before being substituted for Benedikt Höwedes. The following day, he was named in Germany's squad for the 2014 FIFA World Cup. The team won the tournament with Durm as an unused substitute for all of the games.

Career statistics

Club

International

Honours
Borussia Dortmund
DFB-Pokal: 2016–17
DFL-Supercup: 2013, 2014

Eintracht Frankfurt
UEFA Europa League: 2021-22

Germany
FIFA World Cup: 2014

References

External links

Profile at kicker.de

1992 births
Living people
People from Pirmasens
German footballers
German expatriate footballers
1. FSV Mainz 05 II players
Borussia Dortmund II players
Borussia Dortmund players
Huddersfield Town A.F.C. players
Eintracht Frankfurt players
1. FC Kaiserslautern players
Bundesliga players
3. Liga players
Regionalliga players
Premier League players
Expatriate footballers in England
German expatriate sportspeople in England
Germany under-21 international footballers
Germany youth international footballers
Germany international footballers
2014 FIFA World Cup players
FIFA World Cup-winning players
UEFA Europa League winning players
Association football fullbacks
Footballers from Rhineland-Palatinate